Adam A. Zango is a Nigerian actor, singer, dancer, scriptwriter, director, film producer, occasional voice-over, television personality, and philanthropist. He has appeared in over 100 films and received many accolades. Zango has a significant followers in Africa as well as in Nigerian and diaspora at large. In terms of featured film numbers and flexibility, he has been described as the most successful film actor in Africa and the most popular Hausa entertainer in the world.
During the 2000s, he was the most dominant actor in the Hausa movie scene.

Early life and education 

Adam Abdullahi Zango was born on 1 August 1985 at Zango local government in Kaduna State, Nigeria to the Hausa Muslim family of Mallam Abdullahi and Hajiya Yelwa Abdullahi.

Career 

Zango's musical career started from secondary school activities in social club events which he used to represent his school. Zango entered the Hausa film industry in 2001 as a music composer. He started his acting profession as a low level actor and appeared in over 100 Hausa movies.

Prison 

Adam A. Zango was remanded in prison for violating the censorship Board's law in 2007 for release of his music video album Bahaushiya.

Charity
In October 2019, Zango paid 47 million Naira for children and orphans to further their studies.

Filmography

Gallery

References

External links
Hausa

1985 births
Nigerian male film actors
Hausa-language mass media
Living people
People from Kaduna
Male actors in Hausa cinema
21st-century Nigerian male actors
Nigerian male television actors
Nigerian screenwriters
Kannywood actors
Nigerian male singers
Nigerian philanthropists
Nigerian television personalities
Nigerian male dancers
Nigerian film directors
Nigerian male musicians
20th-century births